The Association of Welcoming & Affirming Baptists (AWAB) is a Baptist Christian denomination. The headquarters is in Louisville, Kentucky, United States.

History
The Association was founded by a dozen churches of the American Baptist Churches USA in favor to the inclusion of LGBTQ people in 1993 in San Jose, California.

In 2007, it had 69 member churches.

According to a denomination census released in 2022, it has 141 churches in 3 countries.

Beliefs
The association believes in the full inclusion of lesbian, gay, bisexual and transgender persons in the lives and ministries of Baptist churches.

See also

LGBT-affirming churches
Pullen Memorial Baptist Church (Raleigh, North Carolina)
Wake Forest Baptist Church (Winston-Salem, North Carolina)
University Baptist Church (Austin, Texas)

References

External links
Association of Welcoming and Affirming Baptists — official website

Baptist denominations
LGBT and Baptist churches
LGBT Christian organizations
Christian organizations established in 1993
Baptist denominations established in the 20th century
1993 establishments in the United States